3D Tunnel is a ZX Spectrum video game developed by New Generation Software and published in 1983.

The cassette inlay describes it as, "Another fast moving 3D game from the author of 3D Monster Maze and Defender for the ZX81. Flapping Birds, Scurrying Rats, Leaping Toads, Crawling Spiders all appear live in the 3D Tunnel".

Reception
Computer and Video Games: "Superb graphics and game presentation but not for the non-persistent", 21/30.

ZX Computing: "The graphics are so good that I could have just sat there and watched the demo for an hour. This is very professionally put together and a game that I would recommend to anyone".

References

External links

1983 video games
Europe-exclusive video games
New Generation Software games
Shoot 'em ups
Video games developed in the United Kingdom
ZX Spectrum games
ZX Spectrum-only games